Spitskop Dam is an earth-fill type dam located on the Harts River in the Northern Cape Province north of the city of Kimberley in South Africa. It was established in 1975 and rebuilt in 1989 after breaching during a flood in 1988. It has a full capacity of 57.887 million cubic meters of water and serves primarily for irrigation purposes. The hazard potential of the dam has been ranked high (3).

See also
List of reservoirs and dams in South Africa

References 

 List of South African Dams from the Department of Water Affairs.
 Reyneke, J. 2004 Capacity determination of Spitskop Dam, Department of Water Affairs.

Dams in South Africa
Dams completed in 1975